South Kesteven is a local government district in Lincolnshire, England, forming part of the traditional Kesteven division of the county. It covers Bourne, Grantham, Market Deeping and Stamford. The 2011 census reports 133,788 people at 1.4 per hectare in 57,344 households. The district borders the counties of Cambridgeshire, Leicestershire, Northamptonshire, Nottinghamshire and Rutland. It is also bounded by the Lincolnshire districts of North Kesteven and South Holland.

History
The district was formed on 1 April 1974, under the Local Government Act 1972, from the municipal boroughs of Grantham and Stamford, along with Bourne Urban District, South Kesteven Rural District, and West Kesteven Rural District. Previously the district was run by Kesteven County Council, based in Sleaford.

Geography

South Kesteven borders North Kesteven to the north, as far east as Horbling, where the A52 crosses the South Forty-Foot Drain. From there south it borders South Holland along the South Forty-Foot Drain, crossing the A151 just west of Guthram Gowt. The border follows the River Glen near to Tongue End where at Baston, the boundary crosses north–south over Baston and Langtoft fens. It crosses the A1175 at the B1525 junction (the end of the Deepings bypass), then meets the Welland about two miles west of Crowland at a point called Kennulph's Stone. The parish of Deeping St. James is the south-east corner of the district, where the district borders the unitary authority of City of Peterborough. The boundary follows the Welland to Stamford, briefly following the B1443 (Barnack Road) where it skirts the edge of Burghley Park.

At the point where the railway crosses under the A1, is the corner of two other districts – Rutland and East Northamptonshire. The boundary with Rutland follows the east side of the A1. Since 1991, none of the A1 bypass is in South Kesteven. The boundary meets that of Great Casterton, and briefly follows the B1081 Ermine Street at Toll Bar. The boundary then follows that of Rutland, crossing the East Coast Main Line at Braceborough and Wilsthorpe and again at Carlby. At Castle Bytham, the boundary follows the east side of the A1, and crosses the A1 at South Witham, where a little further west is a corner with the district of Melton. The boundary follows that of Leicestershire along the former Sewstern Lane, which is now the Viking Way where it crosses the eastern end of Saltby Airfield. The boundary deviates from the Viking Way at Woolsthorpe-by-Belvoir where it briefly follows the River Devon. It crosses the A52 and railway at Sedgebrook. This area is part of the Vale of Belvoir. The boundary then passes through the former RAF Bottesford, where just north it meets the district of Newark and Sherwood (Staunton) at Three Shire Oak. The boundary crosses the A1 at Shire Bridge. It follows Shire Dyke at Claypole, crossing the East Coast Main Line, then briefly follows the River Witham. The north-west corner of the district is on the River Witham at Claypole just south of Barnby in the Willows. Further east, a two-mile section of the A17 skirts the district, just east of Byards Leap.

A corner of the district is where it meets the former route of Ermine Street, and now the Viking Way. This is the point where it meets the corners of Cranwell and Byard's Leap, and Temple Bruer with Temple High Grange in North Kesteven. The boundary follows the Viking Way for three miles south, crossing the A17. It follows the B6403 to just north of Ancaster. It skirts Ancaster then rejoins the B6403 south of Ancaster to a point just south of RAF Barkston Heath. It passes just east of Oasby, crosses the A52, passes east of Braceby and Sapperton and Pickworth, then north of Folkingham. North of Horbling it follows the A52 all the way to Donington High Bridge.

Then districts border with Northamptonshire is Britain's smallest border at only 10 metres long. However, the boundary with Rutland was altered in April 1991.

Governance

South Kesteven District Council is elected every four years, with currently 56 councillors being elected at each election. Since the first election in 1973 either the Conservatives have had a majority on the council, or it has been under no overall control. After controlling the council from 1979 to 1991, the Conservatives regained a majority at the 2003 election, which they have held since. After the 2019 elections, the council is composed of the following councillors:

2016 EU Referendum

On Thursday 23 June 2016 South Kesteven voted in only the third major UK-wide referendum on the issue of the United Kingdom's membership of the European Union in the 2016 EU Referendum under the provisions of the European Union Referendum Act 2015 where voters were asked to decide on the question "Should the United Kingdom remain a member of the European Union or leave the European Union?” by voting for either "Remain a member of the European Union" or "Leave the European Union". The result saw a decisive vote to "Leave the European Union" by 60% of the electorate on a high turnout of 78%. The result went against the views of the local MP Nick Boles who was in favour of a "Remain" vote.

The result was declared at Meres Leisure Centre in Grantham early on Friday 24 June by the "Counting officer" (CO) Beverly Agass.

Civil parishes in South Kesteven

 

Allington
Ancaster
Aslackby and Laughton
Barholm and Stowe
Barkston
Barrowby
Baston
Belton and Manthorpe
Billingborough
Bitchfield and Bassingthorpe
Boothby Pagnell
Bourne 
Braceborough and Wilsthorpe
Braceby and Sapperton
Burton Coggles
Careby Aunby and Holywell
Carlby
Carlton Scroop
Castle Bytham
Caythorpe
Claypole
Colsterworth
Corby Glen
Counthorpe and Creeton
Deeping St James
Denton
Dowsby
Dunsby
Dyke
Easton
Edenham
Fenton
Folkingham
Foston
Fulbeck
Great Gonerby
Great Ponton
Greatford
Gunby and Stainby
Haconby
Harlaxton
Heydour
Honington
Horbling
Hough-on-the-Hill
Hougham
Ingoldsby
Irnham
Kirkby Underwood
Langtoft
Lenton, Keisby and Osgodby
Little Bytham
Little Ponton and Stroxton
Londonthorpe and Harrowby Without
Long Bennington
Market Deeping
Marston
Morton and Hanthorpe
Normanton
North Witham
Old Somerby
Pickworth
Pointon
Pointon and Sempringham
Rippingale
Ropsley and Humby
Sedgebrook
Skillington
South Witham
Stamford
Stoke Rochford
Stubton
Swayfield
Swinstead
Syston
Tallington
Thurlby
Twenty
Toft with Lound and Manthorpe
Uffington
Welby
West Deeping
Westborough and Dry Doddington
Witham on the Hill
Woolsthorpe-by-Belvoir
Wyville cum Hungerton

Local area forums
The district council organizes six Local Area Forums (formerly called Local Area Assemblies) which are designed as a medium by which county, district and town/parish councillors, together with local officials, consult the public in the relevant parts of the district.

Representation
Although Lincolnshire County Council, and its funding, is often weighted towards the Greater Lincoln area, the Leader of the county council is Martin Hill OBE, who represents Folkingham Rural, in the east of the district. Peter Robinson, who represents Market Deeping and West Deeping, is one of the two Deputy Leaders of the county council. Sue Woolley, who represents Bourne Abbey, is also on the Executive of the county council.

Demographics

There was a population of 124,745 in the district at the 2001 census; it is the second-largest district in Lincolnshire by population after East Lindsey. However, it has the most people in the county aged under 19 and 25–49. It has the most university-educated people in the county and the healthiest people. It has the most employed people in the county – 61,000. The median age of the district is 39.

The district is the second least deprived in Lincolnshire, after North Kesteven. 60% of the district live in the towns. Sixteen of the villages are Local Service Centres. In the 2001 census, the district had 58,033 dwellings. For Lower Level Super Output Areas (around 1,500 population), there are 18 in the top 10% least deprived in England; around 30,000 people.

Economy
Farming is the main rural industry. The National Transmission System passes north–south through the district just west of Bourne and the A15.

23% of occupations are in hotel and catering; 23% in public administration, education, and health; and 27% in construction and manufacturing. 18% of companies are in knowledge-based industries, fairly high for the nearby region, but lower than Peterborough or Rutland (both 20%); the UK average is 20%. Although the district has a lower job density (jobs per resident) than the UK average, the relatively low local unemployment rate means many residents work outside the district. This also means that unemployed residents would be better looking for employment outside the district.

Stamford has a presence in the publishing sector, specialising in domestic pets and aviation, helped by the proximity of EMAP in Orton, Peterborough. The largest employer in Bourne is the Bourne Prepared Produce site of Bakkavör, who prepare salads, and stir fry vegetables.

The district opened its first purpose-built business innovation centre, called Eventus, on the A1175 at Market Deeping in July 2010. This is to attract high-tech companies, which the district notably lacks (as does most of the county), and was funded by the district and county councils. The district has a stable economy. It lies in the Welland Sub Regional Strategic Partnership (Welland SSP), which covers the district apart from Grantham, and has been run by Welland Enterprise (owned by Norfolk and Waveney Enterprise Services) based at Stoke Rochford. Grantham is covered by Lincolnshire Enterprise. Outside of the main towns, commercial development has been allocated for Colsterworth and the Roseland Business Park at Long Bennington on part of the former RAF Bottesford.

The district forms the northern sector of the Peterborough Sub-Region (formed also with Rutland, South Holland, East Northamptonshire, Huntingdonshire and Fenland). Bourne, Stamford and Market Deeping are in Peterborough's travel to work area (TTWA). North of there, Grantham is the next TTWA. The A15 corridor to Bourne is where most people in the district work in Peterborough. At the 2001 census it was found only 65% of workers work in the district, but 13% go to Peterborough, 3% to Rutland and 2% to North Kesteven. Around 21% of people working in the district live elsewhere – 3% from North Kesteven and Peterborough, and 2% from Rutland. Around 700 people in the district travel to work in London.

In 2011, South Kesteven District Council invested £60,000 to transform a patch of wasteland in Greyfriars into a revitalised play area for children. The initiative is now known as the Arnoldsfield Adventure Area.

Visitor attractions

The district has a 130-mile walk called the South Kesteven Round.
Other attractions be found in the towns of Bourne (Bourne Abbey), Grantham (St Wulfrun's Church), Market Deeping, Stamford (Churches, markets etc.) among other places..

Transport

The A1 passes through the district as does the East Coast Main Line. The A52 is a busy east–west route. The A15 is a quieter route and goes through the centre of many villages.

The Birmingham to Peterborough Line passes through Stamford, which is one of the few east–west routes.

The Skegness to Nottingham line (The Poacher Line) and the East Coast Main Line serve Grantham. This is another east–west route that also carries train services between Norwich and Liverpool.

Education

The district has 51 primary schools and 10 state secondary schools. There are 8 independent schools.

Training
The district had one of two teacher training colleges in the county until 1978 when Kesteven College of Education at Stoke Rochford Hall closed. More recently the district had the Kesteven Agricultural College at Caythorpe Court, in the north of the district. It was taken over by the newly formed University of Lincoln, who closed it one year later in 2002.

Due to neighbouring Rutland not having a further education college, it relies on New College Stamford. Rutland also shares an Employment and Skills Board, Education Business Partnership, Connexions (agency), Aimhigher centre, and learndirect service (Lincolnshire & Rutland Hub based at Lincoln College).

Arms

See also

List of scheduled monuments in South Kesteven

References

External links
 Visitor guide
 SK Local Strategic Partnership
 SK Today – district council newsletter
 Employment Land Capacity Survey by Nathaniel Lichfield and Partners
 Flickr for SKDC
 Council spending in May 2011
 2011 election
 Federation of Small Businesses

South Kesteven District
Non-metropolitan districts of Lincolnshire
Local government districts of the East Midlands